The 2019 Paris–Nice was a road cycling stage race that was held between 10 and 17 March 2019 in France. It was the 77th edition of Paris–Nice and the sixth race of the 2019 UCI World Tour. Spaniard Marc Soler was the defending champion.

Bernal also took the young rider classification. Nairo Quintana of  finished second, with Bernal's teammate Michał Kwiatkowski rounding out the podium as well as taking the points classification. Thomas De Gendt of  took the mountains classification, and Team Sky won the team classification.

Teams
The 18 UCI WorldTeams were automatically invited to the race. In addition five second-tier UCI Continental Circuits received a wildcard invitation to participate in the event.
The teams entering the race will be:

UCI WorldTeams

 
 
 
 
 
 
 
 
 
 
 
 
 
 
 
 
 
 

UCI Professional Continental teams

Route
The race started on 10 March 2019 in Saint-Germain-en-Laye, in the western suburbs of Paris, and finished on 17 March in Nice, covering  over eight stages. After four flat and hilly stages on the first four days, there was a  individual time trial on the fifth day. The seventh stage was the event's queen stage, finishing on the Col de Turini in the Alpes-Maritimes. The eighth and final stage finished on Nice's Promenade des Anglais.

Stages

Stage 1
10 March 2019 — Saint-Germain-en-Laye to Saint-Germain-en-Laye,

Stage 2
11 March 2019 — Les Bréviaires to Bellegarde,

Stage 3
12 March 2019 — Cepoy to Moulins/Yzeure,

Stage 4
13 March 2019 — Vichy to Pélussin,

Stage 5
14 March 2019 — Barbentane to Barbentane,  Individual time trial

Stage 6
15 March 2019 — Peynier to Brignoles,

Stage 7
16 March 2019 — Nice to Col de Turini,

Stage 8
17 March 2019 — Nice to Nice,

Classification leadership table
In the 2019 Paris–Nice, four jerseys were awarded. The general classification was calculated by adding each cyclist's finishing times on each stage. Time bonuses were awarded to the first three finishers on all stages except for the individual time trial: the stage winner won a ten-second bonus, with six and four seconds for the second and third riders respectively. Bonus seconds were also awarded to the first three riders at intermediate sprints – three seconds for the winner of the sprint, two seconds for the rider in second and one second for the rider in third. The leader of the general classification received a yellow jersey. This classification was considered the most important of the 2019 Paris–Nice, and the winner of the classification was considered the winner of the race.

The second classification was the points classification. Riders were awarded points for finishing in the top ten in a stage. Unlike in the points classification in the Tour de France, the winners of all stages were awarded the same number of points. Points were also won in intermediate sprints; three points for crossing the sprint line first, two points for second place, and one for third. The leader of the points classification was awarded a green jersey.

There was also a mountains classification, for which points were awarded for reaching the top of a climb before other riders. Each climb was categorised as either first, second, or third-category, with more points available for the more difficult, higher-categorised climbs. For first-category climbs, the top seven riders earned points; on second-category climbs, five riders won points; on third-category climbs, only the top three riders earned points. The leadership of the mountains classification was marked by a white jersey with red polka-dots.

The fourth jersey represented the young rider classification, marked by a white jersey. Only riders born after 1 January 1994 were eligible; the young rider best placed in the general classification was the leader of the young rider classification. There was also a classification for teams, in which the times of the best three cyclists in a team on each stage were added together; the leading team at the end of the race was the team with the lowest cumulative time.

Final classification standings

General classification

Points classification

Mountains classification

Young rider classification

Teams classification

References

2019
2019 UCI World Tour
2019 in French sport
March 2019 sports events in France